Pride of Performance (Urdu: تمغۂ حسنِ کارکردگی) is a civil award given by the government of Pakistan to Pakistani citizens in recognition of distinguished merit in the fields of literature, arts, sports, medicine, or science for civilians

1960

1961

1962

1963

1964

1965

1966

1967

1968

1969

References

Civil awards and decorations of Pakistan